Mittelbayerische Zeitung is a regional newspaper for Bavaria, Germany, founded in 1945 by Karl Friedrich Esser. Headquartered in Regensburg, the paper employs 550 and is owned by Mittelbayerischer Verlag KG.

The online version can be reached at mittelbayerische.de. There is a paywall installed, but four articles per month are free.

References

External links

 
 Mittelbayerischer Verlag

1945 establishments in Germany
German-language newspapers
Mass media in Regensburg
Newspapers published in Germany
Newspapers established in 1945